Ireland competed at the 2010 Summer Youth Olympics, the inaugural Youth Olympic Games, held in Singapore from 14 August to 26 August 2010.

Medalists

Athletics

Boys
Track and Road Events

Girls
Track and Road Events

Boxing

Boys

Field hockey

Modern pentathlon

Rowing

Sailing

One Person Dinghy

Tennis

Singles

Doubles

Triathlon

Girls

Mixed

References

External links
Competitors List: Ireland

Oly
Nations at the 2010 Summer Youth Olympics
2010